John Boucher may refer to:

John Boucher (1777–1818), English divine
John Boucher (1819–78), British divine
John George Boucher (1895–1960), Canadian ice hockey player
John B. Boucher (1938–2010), Canadian Métis leader

See also
John Bouchier (disambiguation)